Grindavíkurvöllur is a multi-use stadium in Grindavík, Iceland. It is currently used mostly for football matches and is the home stadium of Knattspyrnudeild UMFG. It has a capacity of about 1,450 people.

External links
 Grindavikurvöllur - Nordic Stadiums

References

Football venues in Iceland
Ungmennafélag Grindavíkur